Menso Menso (14 April 1903 – 26 April 1990) was a Dutch sprinter. He competed in the men's 400 metres at the 1924 Summer Olympics.

References

External links
 

1903 births
1990 deaths
Athletes (track and field) at the 1924 Summer Olympics
Dutch male sprinters
Dutch male middle-distance runners
Olympic athletes of the Netherlands
Place of birth missing
20th-century Dutch people